Yemişanlı is a municipality and village in the Qabala Rayon of Azerbaijan. It has a population of 755.

References

Populated places in Qabala District